James Slark (born 16 November 1977) known professionally as James Carlton, is an English actor best known for playing Jason Kirk in Emmerdale and PC Steve Crane in Heartbeat.

He played Jason Kirk from 1999 to 2002 and 35 episodes as Steve Crane from 2003 to 2004. He has also appeared in minor roles or as a visitor in Casualty, Merseybeat, Cold Feet, At Home with the Braithwaites, Where the Heart Is, Doctors and ''Peep Show.

He now successfully runs his own Almond and Walnut farm in California.

References

External links
 
 James Carlton as Jason Kirk

1977 births
Living people
English male television actors
Actors from Bolton